The New Zealand dory (Cyttus novaezealandiae) is a dory, in the family Cyttidae, found around southern Australia, and New Zealand, over the continental shelf at depths of between 20 and 400 m. Its length is between 20 and 30 cm.

References

Other references
 
 Tony Ayling & Geoffrey Cox, Collins Guide to the Sea Fishes of New Zealand, (William Collins Publishers Ltd., Auckland, New Zealand 1982) 

Cyttidae